Electrophaes zaphenges is a moth of the family Geometridae first described by Louis Beethoven Prout in 1940. It is found in Taiwan.

The wingspan is 29–38 mm.

References

Moths described in 1940
Cidariini